In Greek mythology, Coronis is a Thessalian princess and a lover of the god Apollo. She was the daughter of Phlegyas, king of the Lapiths, and Cleophema. By Apollo she became the mother of Asclepius, the Greek god of medicine. While she was still pregnant, she cheated on Apollo with a mortal man named Ischys and was subsequently killed by the god for her betrayal. After failing to heal her, Apollo rescued their unborn child by performing a caesarean section. She was turned into a constellation after her death.

Etymology 
In Ancient Greek  means "curved, bent" and shares the exact same root with the word  (korṓnē), meaning, among other things, "crow," due to the curvature of its beak.

Family 
Zeus gave the hand of the Muse Erato to Malus. The pair had a daughter Cleophema, who married Phlegyas, the king of Lapiths. Their daughter was called Aegle, otherwise known as Coronis. In some other accounts, her father was Azan, king of Arcadia.

Mythology

Lover of Apollo 
One day Apollo saw Coronis and became enamoured of her. He lay with her in her home, and consequently she became pregnant. One time when Apollo was away performing his godly duties, Coronis fell in love with Ischys, son of Elatus. Going against her father's warnings, she slept with him in secret. Apollo, however, discovered this affair through his prophetic powers. Angered, he sent his twin sister, Artemis, to kill Coronis. Accordingly, Artemis killed Coronis and her family with her arrows. In one variation, Artemis kills them on her own accord to avenge the insult done to her brother. Likewise, Ischys was killed by Zeus.

In Ovid's poem, it is a raven that informed Apollo of the affair, and he killed Coronis with his own arrow. Before her death, Coronis accepted that her punishment was just. Apollo instantly regretted his impulsive action and tried to heal her, but Coronis was already dead. He then placed her body on the pyre and poured myrrh and other sweet fragrances on it as a part of the funerary rites. Hyginus also has Coronis' death be at the hands of Apollo.

Not wanting his unborn child to suffer as well, Apollo cut Coronis's belly open when she was laid on her funeral pyre, and rescued the child by pulling it out. He named the child Asclepius and reared him for some time, teaching him about medicinal herbs. Others say that it was Hermes instead who saved the infant from the flames. Later, Apollo entrusted his son to Chiron, the wise centaur, who trained him more in medicine and hunting.

According to a different version, Coronis gave birth to her son in Apollo's temple in the presence of the Moirai. Lachesis acted as the midwife and Apollo himself aided Coronis by easing her pains. Apollo named their son Asclepius after his mother's alias, Aegle.

In yet another version, Coronis who was already impregnated by Apollo, had to accompany her father to the Peloponnesos. She had kept her pregnancy hidden from her father. In Epidaurus, she bore a son and exposed him on a mountain. The child was given milk by one of the goats that pastured about the mountain, and was guarded by the watch-dog of the herd. Aresthanas, the owner of goats and the guard dogs, found the child. As he came near, he saw lightning that flashed from the child, and thinking of it to be a sign of divine, he left the child alone. Asclepius was later taken by Apollo.

The raven and constellation Corvus 
According to Ovid, when Coronis was pregnant, Apollo had appointed a white raven to guard her before leaving. The raven, after learning the affair of Coronis with Ischys, reported it to Apollo. Apollo sent Artemis to kill the couple and in anger, turned the raven black by scorching it as a punishment for being a tattletale and failing its duty. This is why the ravens are black today. According to Antoninus Liberalis, the raven had once been a man named Lycius, a son of Clinis, who was changed into a white raven by Leto and Artemis so he would not be devoured by the donkeys Apollo had driven mad. Furthermore, Antoninus Liberalis calls the man Coronis left Apollo for "Alcyoneus" rather than Ischys.

Istrus (Greek historian) and several others have said that Coronis was turned into the constellation Corvus.

See also 

 Cassandra
 Procris
 Cyparissus
 Ocyrhoe

Notes

References 
 Antoninus Liberalis, The Metamorphoses of Antoninus Liberalis translated by Francis Celoria (Routledge 1992). Online version at the Topos Text Project.
 
 Apollodorus, Apollodorus, The Library, with an English Translation by Sir James George Frazer, F.B.A., F.R.S. in 2 Volumes. Cambridge, MA, Harvard University Press; London, William Heinemann Ltd. 1921. Online version at the Perseus Digital Library.
 Apollonius Rhodius, Argonautica translated by Robert Cooper Seaton (1853–1915), R. C. Loeb Classical Library Volume 001. London, William Heinemann Ltd, 1912. Online version at the Topos Text Project.
 Bacchylides, Corinna. Greek Lyric, Volume IV: Bacchylides, Corinna, and Others. Edited and translated by David A. Campbell. Loeb Classical Library 461. Cambridge, MA: Harvard University Press, 1992.
 Diodorus Siculus, Bibliotheca Historica. Vol 1-2. Immanel Bekker. Ludwig Dindorf. Friedrich Vogel. in aedibus B. G. Teubneri. Leipzig. 1888–1890. Greek text available at the Perseus Digital Library.
 Evelyn-White, Hugh, The Homeric Hymns and Homerica with an English Translation by Hugh G. Evelyn-White. Homeric Hymns. Cambridge, Massachusetts, Harvard University Press; London, William Heinemann Ltd. 1914.
 Hyginus, Gaius Julius, De Astronomica, in The Myths of Hyginus, edited and translated by Mary A. Grant, Lawrence: University of Kansas Press, 1960. Online version at ToposText.
 Hyginus, Gaius Julius, Fabulae, in The Myths of Hyginus, edited and translated by Mary A. Grant, Lawrence: University of Kansas Press, 1960. Online version at ToposText.
  Online version at Perseus.tufts project.
 Ovid. Metamorphoses, Volume I: Books 1-8. Translated by Frank Justus Miller. Revised by G. P. Goold. Loeb Classical Library No. 42. Cambridge, Massachusetts: Harvard University Press, 1977, first published 1916. . Online version at Harvard University Press.
 Pausanias, Pausanias Description of Greece with an English Translation by W.H.S. Jones, Litt.D., and H.A. Ormerod, M.A., in 4 Volumes. Cambridge, MA, Harvard University Press; London, William Heinemann Ltd. 1918. Online version at the Perseus Digital Library.
 Pindar, Odes, Diane Arnson Svarlien. 1990. Online version at the Perseus Digital Library.

External links 
 
 CORONIS from The Theoi Project

Metamorphoses characters
Princesses in Greek mythology
Women of Apollo
Arcadian characters in Greek mythology
Mythological birds of prey
Arcadian mythology
Deeds of Artemis
Thessalian mythology
Deeds of Apollo
Asclepius in mythology
Deeds of Hermes
Thessalian characters in Greek mythology